Lê Văn Phú (born Issifu Ansah; 13 June 1983) is a Vietnamese Ghanaian footballer who plays as a defender for Nam Định

References

External links
 Official Facebook

1983 births
Living people
Vietnamese footballers
Ghanaian footballers
Vietnamese people of Ghanaian descent
Association football defenders
V.League 1 players
Khatoco Khánh Hòa FC players
Haiphong FC players
Ghanaian emigrants to Vietnam